Longipenis deltidius is a moth in the family Lecithoceridae. It is found in Fujian, China.

References

Moths described in 1994
Lecithoceridae